Fareeha Mehmood (born 19 February 1994) is a Pakistani cricketer who plays as a wicket-keeper and left-handed batter. She made her Twenty20 International debut for Pakistan against Sri Lanka on 28 March 2018.

References

External links
 
 

1994 births
Living people
Cricketers from Lahore
Pakistani women cricketers
Pakistan women Twenty20 International cricketers
Federal Capital women cricketers
Higher Education Commission women cricketers
Lahore women cricketers
Omar Associates women cricketers
State Bank of Pakistan women cricketers